Häkkinen is a Finnish surname. Notable people with the surname include:

 Hilda Häkkinen (1894–2005), Finnish supercentenarian
 Eero Häkkinen (1911–1976), Finnish politician
 Kalevi Häkkinen (1928–2017), Finnish Olympic skier
 Markku Häkkinen (born 1946), Finnish botanist; authority on the family Musaceae
 Hannu Häkkinen (born 1962), Finnish professor of computational nanoscience
 Mika Häkkinen (born 1968), Finnish racing driver, F1 champion
 Pasi Häkkinen (born 1977), Finnish ice hockey player
 Henri Häkkinen (born 1980), Finnish sport shooter

See also
Jay Hakkinen, American biathlete

Finnish-language surnames